Dukhiram Swain (died 18 January 1995) was an Indian film and television actor. He was one of the most popular villains in Odia cinema and played a variety of roles most notably as the antagonist in many Odia films and various roles in television serials. He was considered to be one amongst the club of natural actors. He was won the National Film Award  for Shesha Shrabana (1976), the Orissa State Film Award for Best Supporting Actor and several "Best Villain" awards from State Film Awards and the Orissa Sangeet Natak Akademi. He was honoured with the Jayadeva Purashkar of Odisha.

Life and career
Late Dukhiram Swain was born in Daraba, Jagatsinghpur district, Odisha. He was a linguist and could speak several languages fluently. He started his acting Career from Annapurna Theatre (Cuttack ). His first movie was Sri Lokenath (1960). He was mostly offered negative roles and over the years he developed a cult status in this genre of acting. On contrary to the villainous characters he portrayed in his films, he was very social & generous and was also member of various organizations. Matira Manisha, Jajabara, Shesha Shrabana, Phula Chandana, Paradeshi Chadhei and Rana Bhumi are some of his most notable films. He has acted almost all kinds of roles ranging from hero, villain, comedian, character roles etc.

Awards and honours

 He was honoured with Orissa Sangeet Nataka Akademi Award for the Year 1984-85 in the Acting category.
 He was honoured with Orissa State Film Award for Best Supporting Actor : Bhulihuena in 1987.
 He was honoured with the Jayadev Award (1994) for outstanding contribution to the growth and development of Oriya cinema.

Filmography

 Lakhe Siba Puji Paichi Pua (1997)
 Rana Bhumi (1995) As Pradhan
 Akuha Katha (1994)
 Rakhile Siba Mariba Kie (1994)
 Sagar Ganga (1994) As Bhabhani Rai
 Suna Bhauja (1994)
 Bhagya Hate Doro (1993) As Mahendra
 Dadagiri (1993) As S.P. Abinash
 Anti Churi Tanti Kate (1992)
 Ghara Mora Swarga (1992)
 Maa Jahara Saha (1992) As Nishakar
 To Binu Anya Gati Nahin (1991) As Satura
 Udandi Seeta as Police Inspector
 Ama Ghara Ama Sansar (1991)
 Bastra Haran (1991) As Magistrate/ Abhijit's father
 Kapala Likhana (1991)
 Drishti, 1990 
 Chakadola Karuchi Leela (1990)
 Daiba Daudi (1990) as Jailor/Bobby's father
 Hisab Kariba Kalia (1990) As Chowdhury
 Maa Mate Shakti De (1990)
 Paradeshi Chadhei (1990)
 Asuchi Mo Kalia Suna (1989)
 Pratisodha Aparadh Nuhen (1989)
 Sasti (1989)
 Jahaku Rakhibe Ananta (1989) As Jagdish Rai
 Kanyadaan (1988) As Kailash Chowdhury
 Pua Moro Kala Thakura (1988)
 Akashara Aakhi (1987)
 Chaka Aakhi Sabu Dekhuchi (1987)
 Jor Jar Mulak Tar (1986) As Rudra Narayan
 Phula Chandana (1986)
 Grihalakshmi (1985) As Ashok's father
 Chaka Bhaunri (1985)
 Hakim Babu (1985)
 Mamata Mage Mula (1985)
 Samay Bada Balwan (1985)As D. J.
 School Master (1985)
 Dora (1984) As Wine vendor
 Swapna Sagara (1983) As Sardar
 Batasi Jhada (1981)
 Bilwa Mangala (1981)
 Sei Sura (1981)
 Balidan (1978)
 Jhilmil (1978)
 Saakhi Gopinath (1978)
 Shesha Shrabana (1976) As Nidhi Misra
 Jajabara (1975) As Rashbihari Samantrai
 Adina Megha (1970)
 Matira Manisha (1966) As Hari Mishra
 Sri Lokenath (1960)

Photo gallery

Personal life

He was married to the late Mrs. Hemalata Swain. He is survived by two sons, Mr. Akash Kumar Swain (Jagatsinghpur), Mr. Prithiviraj Swain (Cuttack) and one daughter, Mrs. Dharitri (Swain) Das (the marriage was to Mr. Nimain Charana Das and was settled in Bolangir). He is survived, as well, by three grandchildren from his daughter's side, Mrs. Pragyan Paramita Das (the marriage was to Mr. Dhrutiman Das and was settled in Bangalore), Ms. Prachi Sucharita Das (Bhubaneswar), and Mr. Niroopkanti Das (Patnagarh).

Notes

External links
 
 
 
 
 
  The New Indian Express 8 November 2009 The versatility in villainy By Kasturi Ray
  Jayadev Awards 13- Dukhiram Swain, Actor (posthumous) (1994)
  ORISSA STATE FILM AWARD WINNERS – 1987 12 Best Supporting Actor : Sri Dukhiram Swain(Bhulihuena)
  The Hindu Monday, 13 December 2010 actor and director Ram Chandra Paratihari took the Dukhiram Swain Award at State-level Amateur Drama Festival

Year of birth missing
1995 deaths
Ollywood
People from Cuttack
Male actors in Odia cinema
People from Jagatsinghpur district
20th-century Indian male actors
Male actors from Odisha